María Carolina López (born 6 May 1980) is an Argentine actress and comedian.

Filmography

Film

Television

References

External links
 
 

1980 births
21st-century Argentine actresses
21st-century comedians
Argentine film actresses
Argentine television actresses
Feminist comedians
Living people
Place of birth missing (living people)